Lincoln Township is one of the sixteen townships of Morrow County, Ohio, United States.  The 2010 census found 2,063 people in the township, 258 of whom lived in the village of Fulton.

Geography
Located in the southwestern part of the county, it borders the following townships:
Gilead Township - north
Harmony Township - east
Bennington Township - southeast
Peru Township - south
Westfield Township - west
Cardington Township - northwest

Two villages are located in Lincoln Township: part of Cardington in the northwest, and Fulton in the east.

Name and history
Lincoln Township was organized in 1828. The township was named for Benjamin Lincoln (1733–1810), a general in the American Revolutionary War. It is the only Lincoln Township statewide.

Government
The township is governed by a three-member board of trustees, who are elected in November of odd-numbered years to a four-year term beginning on the following January 1. Two are elected in the year after the presidential election and one is elected in the year before it. There is also an elected township fiscal officer, who serves a four-year term beginning on April 1 of the year after the election, which is held in November of the year before the presidential election. Vacancies in the fiscal officership or on the board of trustees are filled by the remaining trustees.

References

External links
County website

Townships in Morrow County, Ohio
1828 establishments in Ohio
Populated places established in 1828
Townships in Ohio